Salvatore Lanzetti (c.1710 – c.1780) was an Italian cellist and composer of the late Baroque and early Classical era.

Life and career 
Salvatore Lanzetti was a student at the Conservatorio Santa Maria di Loreto in Naples. He was first employed in Lucca, where he worked with Francesco Maria Veracini. In 1727 he entered the service of Victor Amadeus II of Sardinia at the court of Turin, where he again worked from 1760 until his death. From 1739 to 1754 Lanzetti worked in Paris and London. He gave concerts in Sicily, Paris (at the Concert Spirituel in May 1736), and Germany.

Lanzetti was a virtuoso cellist who contributed to several developments in cello technique, including difficult uses of the bow, double-stops, complex fingering, and using the thumb as a "capotasto".

Works 
 12 Cello sonatas Op. 1 (1750, Paris)
 6 Cello sonatas Op. 2 (1754, London)
 6 Cello sonatas Op. 5 (undated, Paris)
 Other Sonatas in Manuscript

References

External links 
 

18th-century births
18th-century deaths
18th-century Italian composers
18th-century Italian male musicians
Composers for cello
Italian Baroque composers
Italian male classical composers